Mara DePuy (born July 30, 1973) is an American equestrian. She competed in the individual eventing at the 1996 Summer Olympics.

References

External links
 

1973 births
Living people
American female equestrians
Olympic equestrians of the United States
Equestrians at the 1996 Summer Olympics
Equestrians at the 1995 Pan American Games
Equestrians at the 2007 Pan American Games
Pan American Games medalists in equestrian
Pan American Games silver medalists for the United States
Place of birth missing (living people)
Medalists at the 1995 Pan American Games
21st-century American women